Le Riche Cup is the foremost football cup competition for teams playing on the island of Jersey. It is overseen by the Jersey Football Association.

References

Football in Jersey